Halichoeres argus, or the Argus wrasse, is a species of salt water wrasse found in the Indo-West Pacific Ocean from Sri Lanka to Fiji and Tonga, then north to Taiwan, south to northern Australia.

Size

References

argus
Taxa named by Marcus Elieser Bloch
Taxa named by Johann Gottlob Theaenus Schneider
Fish described in 1801